Atakan Gündüz (born 1 January 2001) is a Turkish professional footballer who plays as a defender for Kırklarelispor.

Career
On 19 June 2019, Gündüz transferred to Trabzonspor from Altınordu. He made his professional debut for Trabzonspor in a 1-0 Süper Lig win over Başakşehir on 19 February 2021.

References

External links
 
 

2001 births
People from Lüleburgaz
Living people
Turkish footballers
Turkey youth international footballers
Association football defenders
Trabzonspor footballers
İstanbulspor footballers
1461 Trabzon footballers
Kırklarelispor footballers
Süper Lig players
TFF Second League players